"Time After Time" is a romantic jazz standard with lyrics written by Sammy Cahn and music by Jule Styne in 1946.

First recordings
The first recording was on November 19, 1946 for Musicraft by Sarah Vaughan with the Teddy Wilson Quartet: Wilson on piano, Charlie Ventura on tenor saxophone, Remo Palmieri on guitar, and Billy Taylor on double bass.

The song was written for Frank Sinatra to introduce in the 1947 MGM film It Happened in Brooklyn. The pianist providing the offscreen accompaniment was André Previn to an arrangement of Axel Stordahl. Later in the film, the song was reprised in full by Kathryn Grayson. The only contemporary recording by a British artist was the one by Steve Conway.

Sinatra recorded it again in 1957 with the Nelson Riddle Orchestra. After it emerged as a jazz standard thanks to saxophonists like Getz and Coltrane, 1959 was a banner year for its popularity, being covered by many pop and jazz vocalists.

Other versions
 Chet Baker, Chet Baker Sings, 1954
 Stan Getz, Award Winner, 1957
 Frank Sinatra, This Is Sinatra Volume 2, 1957
 John Coltrane, Stardust, 1958
 Connie Francis, The Exciting Connie Francis, 1959
 Ricky Nelson, More Songs By Ricky, 1959
 Paul Desmond with Jim Hall, First Place Again, 1959
 Dinah Washington, What a Diff'rence a Day Makes!, 1959
 Joe Morello with Phil Woods and Gary Burton, It's About Time, 1961
 The Isley Brothers, Twist & Shout, 1962
 Nancy Wilson, Gentle Is My Love, 1965
Margaret Whiting, The Wheel of Hurt, 1966.  A performance of this song was also heard on the soundtrack to Nora Ephron’s 2009 film Julie & Julia.
 Chris Montez, Time After Time, 1966
 Dusty Springfield, Where Am I Going?, 1967(she also sang it live on her BBC-TV show the same year)
 Matt Monro, The Late, Late Show, 1968
 Freddie Hubbard with Ricky Ford and Kenny Barron, The Rose Tattoo, 1983
 Johnny Mathis, "The Hollywood Musicals", 1986
 Carly Simon, My Romance, 1990
 Brent Spiner, Ol' Yellow Eyes Is Back, 1991
 Jacky Terrasson, self-titled album, 1994.
Etta James, Time After Time (Etta James album), 1995.
 Ian Shaw, The Echo of a Song, 1996
 Harry Connick Jr., Come by Me, 1999
 Rod Stewart, The Great American Songbook, 2003
 Debby Boone, Reflections of Rosemary, 2005
 Rachel York, Let's Fall in Love, 2005
 She & Him, Classics, 2014
 Fujii Kaze, Help Ever Hurt Cover, 2020

References

Songs about nostalgia
1947 songs
Harry Connick Jr. songs
Chris Montez songs
Jazz songs
Shirley Bassey songs
Vikki Carr songs
Songs with lyrics by Sammy Cahn
Songs with music by Jule Styne